Gavrilovka is the name of several inhabited localities in Russia.

Urban localities
Gavrilovka, Dzerzhinsk, Nizhny Novgorod Oblast, a work settlement under the administrative jurisdiction of the city of oblast significance of Dzerzhinsk in Nizhny Novgorod Oblast

Rural localities
Gavrilovka, Bala-Chetyrmansky Selsoviet, Fyodorovsky District, Republic of Bashkortostan, a selo in Bala-Chetyrmansky Selsoviet of Fyodorovsky District in the Republic of Bashkortostan
Gavrilovka, Fedorovsky Selsoviet, Fyodorovsky District, Republic of Bashkortostan, a village in Fedorovsky Selsoviet of Fyodorovsky District in the Republic of Bashkortostan
Gavrilovka, Kugarchinsky District, Republic of Bashkortostan, a village in Irtyubyaksky Selsoviet of Kugarchinsky District in the Republic of Bashkortostan
Gavrilovka, Kirovsky District, Kaluga Oblast, a village in Kirovsky District of Kaluga Oblast
Gavrilovka, Tarussky District, Kaluga Oblast, a village in Tarussky District of Kaluga Oblast
Gavrilovka, Republic of Karelia, a village in Olonetsky District of the Republic of Karelia
Gavrilovka, Guryevsk, Kemerovo Oblast, a settlement under the administrative jurisdiction of the town of district significance of Salair under the administrative jurisdiction of Guryevsk City Under Oblast Jurisdiction in Kemerovo Oblast
Gavrilovka, Kurtukovskaya Rural Territory, Novokuznetsky District, Kemerovo Oblast, a settlement in Kurtukovskaya Rural Territory of Novokuznetsky District in Kemerovo Oblast
Gavrilovka, Kuzedeyevskaya Rural Territory, Novokuznetsky District, Kemerovo Oblast, a settlement in Kuzedeyevskaya Rural Territory of Novokuznetsky District in Kemerovo Oblast
Gavrilovka, Komi Republic, a village in Palevitsy Administrative Territory of Syktyvdinsky District in the Komi Republic
Gavrilovka, Krasnoyarsk Krai, a village in Yuzhno-Alexandrovsky Selsoviet of Ilansky District in Krasnoyarsk Krai
Gavrilovka, Kursk Oblast, a village in Tolpinsky Selsoviet of Korenevsky District in Kursk Oblast
Gavrilovka, Republic of Mordovia, a village in Novoalexandrovsky Selsoviet of Staroshaygovsky District in the Republic of Mordovia
Gavrilovka, Semyonov, Nizhny Novgorod Oblast, a village in Shaldezhsky Selsoviet under the administrative jurisdiction of the city of oblast significance of Semyonov in Nizhny Novgorod Oblast
Gavrilovka, Koverninsky District, Nizhny Novgorod Oblast, a village in Gavrilovsky Selsoviet of Koverninsky District in Nizhny Novgorod Oblast
Gavrilovka, Kargatsky District, Novosibirsk Oblast, a settlement in Kargatsky District of Novosibirsk Oblast
Gavrilovka, Kyshtovsky District, Novosibirsk Oblast, a village in Kyshtovsky District of Novosibirsk Oblast
Gavrilovka, Abdulinsky District, Orenburg Oblast, a village in Yemantayevsky Selsoviet of Abdulinsky District in Orenburg Oblast
Gavrilovka, Alexandrovsky District, Orenburg Oblast, a selo in Romanovsky Selsoviet of Alexandrovsky District in Orenburg Oblast
Gavrilovka, Buzuluksky District, Orenburg Oblast, a village in Derzhavinsky Selsoviet of Buzuluksky District in Orenburg Oblast
Gavrilovka, Saraktashsky District, Orenburg Oblast, a selo in Gavrilovsky Selsoviet of Saraktashsky District in Orenburg Oblast
Gavrilovka, Penza Oblast, a selo in Anuchinsky Selsoviet of Kamensky District in Penza Oblast
Gavrilovka, Rostov Oblast, a khutor in Kiyevskoye Rural Settlement of Kasharsky District in Rostov Oblast
Gavrilovka, Samara Oblast, a selo in Alexeyevsky District of Samara Oblast
Gavrilovka, Saratov Oblast, a selo in Baltaysky District of Saratov Oblast
Gavrilovka, Smolensk Oblast, a village in Saveyevskoye Rural Settlement of Roslavlsky District in Smolensk Oblast
Gavrilovka, Michurinsky District, Tambov Oblast, a selo in Zhidilovsky Selsoviet of Michurinsky District in Tambov Oblast
Gavrilovka, Rzhaksinsky District, Tambov Oblast, a village in Gavrilovsky Selsoviet of Rzhaksinsky District in Tambov Oblast
Gavrilovka, Ivanovsky Selsoviet, Sampursky District, Tambov Oblast, a village in Ivanovsky Selsoviet of Sampursky District in Tambov Oblast
Gavrilovka, Sampursky Selsoviet, Sampursky District, Tambov Oblast, a selo in Sampursky Selsoviet of Sampursky District in Tambov Oblast
Gavrilovka, Sosnovsky District, Tambov Oblast, a village in Olkhovsky Selsoviet of Sosnovsky District in Tambov Oblast
Gavrilovka, Udmurt Republic, a village in Gavrilovsky Selsoviet of Votkinsky District in the Udmurt Republic
Gavrilovka, Ulyanovsk Oblast, a selo in Mikhaylovsky Rural Okrug of Terengulsky District in Ulyanovsk Oblast

See also 
 Gavrilovka 2-ya